A Nerf Blaster is a toy gun made by Hasbro that fires foam darts, arrows, discs, or foam balls. The term "Nerf gun" or the more common term “nerf blaster” are often used to describe the toy. Nerf blasters are manufactured in multiple forms; the first Nerf blasters emerged in the late 1980s with the release of the Nerf Blast-a-Ball and Arrowstorm. Today, Hasbro has produced over twenty unique lines of Nerf-brand blasters, which each line centered around a particular theme or type of ammunition. Moreover, Hasbro has also produced Nerf blasters based around specific franchises, including Marvel Comics, Star Wars, G.I. Joe, Fortnite, Transformers, Overwatch, Halo Infinite, and Roblox. Nerf blasters are available in several international marketplaces, although some blasters have their names changed or are not sold in certain countries due to laws surrounding toy safety franchises.

Furthermore, Nerf blasters have gained a significant following in the cosplay community, where fans create intricate costumes and props inspired by their favorite characters. They have also been adopted by schools and youth organizations as a form of active play and team-building exercise

Most Nerf brands are packaged with a set of the ammunition it fires, and ammunition refills are also sold separately in greater quantities or bought online. Some blasters can also be customized with special-made attachments, which are either included with the blaster or sold separately. Many non-Nerf brand blasters are also cross-compatible with Nerf brand darts and magazines, in order to take advantage of the name-brand’s existing ecosystem.

Nerf blasters have been acclaimed for their popularity, particularly among boys and young adults. Additionally, a community has grown around Nerf blasters, as competitive and casual “Nerf wars” are commonly held among enthusiasts in various forms, similar to Airsoft and paintball. A significant modding community has also formed among enthusiasts, who aim to improve the performance and accuracy of existing blasters through upgraded parts and different dart or ammo types.

Modern product lines

This list consists solely of Nerf brand blasters released since 2003.

N-Strike

First introduced in 2003, N-Strike blasters established many trends seen in modern dart blasters. These darts have a body made of a colored foam, with a rubberized plastic tip to improve range and accuracy. Additionally, some N-Strike blasters such as the Recon CS-6 were also characterized by the ability to customize them with attachments, a common sight among today’s blasters. Some magazine-fed N-Strike blasters required a different type of ammunition than non-magazine fed ones, however the ammo type was updated and homogenized between all blaster types with the successor line N-Strike Elite.

The first N-Strike blaster, the Unity Power System included 3 blasters in one. A small pistol, an automatic pistol and a rocket launcher.

In 2010, the Stampede ECS - a bi-pod-mounted, battery-powered blaster which is loaded with dart magazines - was awarded "Boy Toy of the Year" at the 11th Annual Toy of the Year Awards, which is held at the American International Toy Fair in New York City. Popular Mechanics praised it as "the best overall Nerf gun ever", being easy to use and less prone to jamming than earlier battery-powered Nerf models.

Gear Up
Gear Up was a limited edition line of certain N-Strike blasters painted orange and black instead of their usual blue color. They were produced as a promotion for Hasbro’s then-upcoming Nerf Vortex blaster line, and blasters included a sample of the new XLR Disc ammo, used in the Vortex blasters. Due to their brief production period, Gear Up blasters have been highly collectible, and the range includes re-skins of the Raider CS-35, Maverick REV-6, Barricade RV-10, and Recon CS-6

Clear Series.

The Clear Series was a limited edition line of certain N-Strike blasters that utilized clear, see through plastic. They were a Target exclusive in the United States and came packaged with red streamline darts. Some have complained that the seals in the clear blasters have looser seals, leading to poorer performance. Additionally, the clear plastic has been called "thin" compared to other blasters.

Elite Repaint

This was an unofficial series in which N-Strike blasters were repainted to imitate N-Strike Elite blasters, but were not officially labeled so on the box, and the internals were not updated to match Elite performance.

Light It Up

This was a series that included one N-Strike blaster, the N-Strike Rayven CS-18. The two blasters (the other being the Vortex Lumitron) used glow in the dark darts and discs.

Red Strike 

These blasters were released for a limited time towards the end of 2009, and were repainted N-Strike blasters with a red, black and grey color scheme. The limited availability of these blasters (Recon, Vulcan, and Longshot) has led them to become very rare, expensive, and sought after.

Sonic Fire

This series was repainted blasters with dark translucent red plastic. Only 2 N-Strike blasters were utilized in this series, the Barrel Break and the Jolt.

Sonic

This series was repainted N-Strike blasters with translucent green plastic. They were a Toys R Us exclusive in the United States.

Whiteout Series

This series was repainted N-Strike blasters with a white base, and orange and grey detailing. They were a Walmart exclusive in the United States, and some have claimed a performance increase in Whiteout blasters. A fifth Whiteout blasters, a repaint of the N-Strike Spectre, was expected to be released but was never released, despite online images being found.

ICON Series

In 2019, the N-Strike ICON series was released to celebrate Nerf's 50th birthday. These were re-releases of original N-Strike blasters with the same paint yellow paint scheme and added a ICON Series logo onto the blasters to differentiate older models from newer models. The plunger tube in the ICON Series Longshot was made significantly smaller, leading to limited modification potential. The ICON series element was given updated internals to shoot similar to an N-Strike Elite blaster, as was the ICON Series Magstrike. The ICON Series Magstrike was advertised with a 10 dart clip, though the original Magstrike was advertised with a 10 darts magazine.

N-Strike Elite
On August 1, 2012, the N-Strike series was succeeded by N-Strike Elite, which improved on the internal mechanisms for better firing distances. The series was succeeded in 2020 by the N-Strike Elite 2.0 series.

Several subseries have been released under the N-Strike Elite line, including:

 BattleCamo. These were re-painted Elite and Mega blasters featuring a white, blue, and orange color scheme.
 Multishot Madness. Only one Elite blaster was released in this series, the Elite Rough Cut 2x4.
 Sonic Ice. Similar to the N-Strike Sonic series, these blasters had translucent blue plastic instead of translucent green plastic. These were repainted Elite and Mega blasters.
 Sonic Fire. These blasters had dark translucent red plastic, and were repainted Elite blasters.

N-Strike Mega
N-Strike Mega, formally N-Strike Mega Series, is a line of blasters which fire red-colored ammunition larger than most darts in both size and diameter. In addition, they are also designed to whistle through the air when fired. Mega was originally marketed as a sub-series of N-Strike and N-Strike Elite, but became its own series in 2016. A subseries of the Mega line is the Mega XL series, which utilizes even larger darts.

Mega blasters have been used in the following series

 BattleCamo 
 Sonic Ice
 AccuStrike
 Z.E.D. Squad

N-Strike Elite XD
However, Hasbro later adjusted their marketing campaign for these blasters to no longer claim performance improvements after consumers found them to be negligible. Many XD blasters were simply their N-Strike Elite and N-Strike Mega counterparts re-shelled in different color plastic.

N-Strike Modulus
N-Strike Modulus (formally Nerf Modulus Series) is a sub-line of the N-Strike Elite series with an emphasis on user-customization through attachments and accessories. Many Modulus blasters came packaged with a variety of new and unique attachments; for instance, the Nerf Tri-Strike came included with attachments for launching Mega darts and foam missiles in addition to the standard N-Strike Elite darts. These blasters are typically white and grey, with additional accent colors such as green and blue.

AccuStrike Series
The AccuStrike Series is a category of Nerf blaster released in spring 2017. Some AccuStrike blasters are unique to the line, while others are re-skins of blasters from other lines. They include and are intended to fire an updated dart of the same name which are designed to improve accuracy. However, AccuStrike darts and blasters are cross-compatible with those of the N-Strike Elite line. AccuStrike darts have also been used the in N-Strike Mega line and the Rebelle series.

Zombie Strike
The Zombie Strike series was introduced in 2013 and contains blasters similar in performance to that of the N-Strike Elite line; some of which are simple re-skins. Zombie Strike blasters are themed as weapons made from a toolshed, and are often green and orange in color. Early Zombie Strike blasters seemed to have an American-cowboy style, though later blasters seemed to follow a zombie-apocalyptic theme. The Zombie Strike line also has several variants, such as:

 Z.E.D Squad, simple recolors of existing blasters
 Power Shock (Stylized as POWER SHOCK), a sub-series which features blasters with built-in lights and sounds, themed around the human survivors discovering a way to power their blasters
 Survival System, which focuses on optional attachments, similar to the Modulus line

Rebelle
Nerf Rebelle is a line introduced in fall 2013 aimed at the female demographic. As such, Rebelle blasters incorporate feminine designs and pastel colors. This line was discontinued in 2020.

Vortex
The Nerf Vortex line, launched in 2011, uses “XLR” (“Xtra Long Range”) foam discs as opposed to darts. They came in three different colors, green, white or glow-in-the-dark. These discs are capable of traveling at greater distances than darts fired from original N-Strike blasters (up to ) and can also ricochet off walls.

Hasbro relaunched the line as Vortex VTX in fall 2018.

Nitro
Nerf Nitro is a brand of blasters that fire foam cars instead of darts. Each Nitro set includes accessories such as obstacles to hit and ramps to launch the cars in the air.

Alpha Strike
Introduced in August 2019, Nerf Alpha Strike is a blaster line priced much lower with and built more cheaply compared to other Nerf lines. Designed as a budget series, it was introduced to compete with blasters from competing brands, which often sell for lower prices than their Nerf brand counterparts. Most of the Alpha Strike blasters only fire one dart at time (single-shot), for example, the Tiger includes two barrels and is modeled after a shotgun, but it does not function like a normal Nerf shotgun. The Alpha Strike series features products intended to be sold inexpensively in order to make Nerf accessible to everyone. Unlike other series, most Alpha Strike blasters do not feature any sort of accessory attachment points, such as tactical rails, stock attachment points, or barrel extension points. With guns such as,Mantis LR 1 and the Vanguard LR 1.  See this link for further information, https://www.youtube.com/watch?v=1pJ8cDQU2zM

Ultra
Ultra darts are constructed from a lightweight foam that is notably different than traditional darts in that they are made with closed-cell foam rather than open-cell. This construction allows for fins to be molded into the rear of the darts. Ultra darts are between N-Strike Elite and Mega darts in diameter, but shorter than both in length. Ultra darts and blasters are not cross-compatible with ammo from other Nerf lines, a decision made in response to the growing number of third-party darts available for N-Strike Elite blasters at a much lower cost than Nerf-brand darts.

Many Ultra blasters are black and white in color, with “ULTRA” emblazoned on the side in gold text. The first blaster in the Ultra line was the Nerf Ultra One, and has since seen blasters with various different loading and feeding mechanisms, similar to other Nerf lines.

Despite Ultra being the best for range, it does not do well performance wise. A great example of this would be the UItra SPEED blaster, where the darts start descending quickly after they're fired out of the barrel.

RIVAL
Released in 2015, Nerf RIVAL blasters are targeted towards teenagers and young adults. They fire high-impact spherical foam balls (often called “Rival rounds”) instead of darts. Many RIVAL blasters are painted or include accessories meant to distinguish between blue and red teams for competitive play; most RIVAL blasters are available in both colors. The first RIVAL blasters introduced were the Apollo XV-700 and the Zeus MXV-1200. The RIVAL line is not available in Australia due to toy regulations. As of 2021, the latest blaster in the RIVAL line is the Helix XXI-2000, designed curve shots in multiple directions.

Sub-series of RIVAL include:
 RIVAL Camo: Blasters re-skinned with a camouflage color scheme; introduced in 2018
 RIVAL Edge: Blasters are green in color (instead of the usual blue, white, or red), released in 2019. The Edge series places emphasis on accuracy and precision. All blasters exclusive to this sub-series are modeled after sniper rifles and feature long barrels.
 RIVAL Phantom Corps: Released in 2017, Phantom Corps blasters are white in color and include special flags that attach to the sling mounts to mark which team the blaster belongs to.

See also
Nerf war
Nerf Arena Blast – First-person shooter game for the PC using Nerf Blasters.
Nerf N-Strike and Nerf N-Strike Elite – First person shoot em up games for the Wii using Nerf Blasters.
Lazer Tag – Laser tag guns currently sold under the Nerf brand.

References

External links
Official Nerf site

Hasbro products
Toy weapons
1980s toys
1990s toys
2000s toys
2010s toys
2020s toys